The 2015 women's road cycling season was the sixth for the  Aromitalia Vaiano cycling team, which began as the Vaiano Solaristech in 2010.

Roster

Season victories

UCI World Ranking

The 2015 UCI Women's Road Rankings are rankings based upon the results in all UCI-sanctioned races of the 2015 women's road cycling season.

Aromitalia Vaiano finished 24th in the 2015 ranking for UCI teams.

Footnotes

References

External links
 

2015 UCI Women's Teams seasons
2015 in Italian sport
Aromitalia Vaiano